The 2021 Patriot League softball tournament was held at the BU Softball Field on the campus of Boston University in Boston, Massachusetts from May 13 through May 15, 2021. The tournament was won by the Boston University Terriers, who earned the Patriot League's automatic bid to the 2021 NCAA Division I softball tournament

Tournament

Bracket

References

Patriot League softball tournament
Patriot League softball tournament
Tournament